WSYL (1490 AM) was a radio station owned by Neal Ardman, through licensee NIA Broadcasting, Inc.

License renewal hearing and cancellation
On March 9, 2021, the Federal Communications Commission designated the station's license renewal for hearing due to being silent for 73 percent of the last three years, including 270 days in 2019 during which the station operated at reduced power without FCC approval. On March 29, 2021, the FCC released a statement saying the hearing would be terminated with prejudice because of NIA Broadcasting's decision to cancel the license for WSYL.

References

External links
FCC Station Search Details: DWSYL (Facility ID: 58752)
FCC History Cards for WSYL (covering 1955-1981)

SYL
Radio stations established in 1975
Radio stations disestablished in 2021
2021 disestablishments in Georgia (U.S. state)
Defunct radio stations in the United States
SYL